Daniel Poudrier (born February 15, 1964) is a Canadian retired professional ice hockey player who played 25 games in the National Hockey League for the Quebec Nordiques.

Poudrier was born in Thetford Mines, Quebec. As a youth, he played in the 1976 and 1977 Quebec International Pee-Wee Hockey Tournaments with a minor ice hockey team from Thetford Mines.

After retiring from hockey, Poudrier became a city councillor (District 10) in Thetford Mines.

Career statistics

References

External links

1964 births
Living people
Canadian ice hockey defencemen
Dragons de Rouen players
Drummondville Voltigeurs players
Eisbären Berlin players
Fredericton Express players
French Quebecers
EV Füssen players
Grizzlys Wolfsburg players
Halifax Citadels players
Ice hockey people from Quebec
EHC Klostersee players
EV Landshut players
Muskegon Lumberjacks players
Quebec municipal councillors
Quebec Nordiques draft picks
Quebec Nordiques players
Shawinigan Cataractes players
Sportspeople from Thetford Mines
St. Thomas Wildcats players
Wiener EV players